Dumb Bell of the Yukon is a 1946 Disney animated short starring Donald Duck and Daisy Duck. It was directed by Jack King.

Plot
It starts off with Donald reading a letter from Daisy telling him to make her some fur coats. So, Donald goes off to hunt bears. Donald wanders into a bear cave and sees a momma bear and a baby bear. He pictures the baby bear being a fur coat. He uses "essence of honey" to capture the baby bear. The momma bear mistakes Donald for the baby bear and starts licking and hugging him. Donald takes the baby bear home and puts it in a lot of stances. Donald then thinks of the ways he could kill the bear. Donald tries to hang the bear with no success. The momma bear realizes that her baby is not there and follows Donald's footprints to his house. Donald disguises himself as the baby bear. The momma bear accidentally squeezes Donald too tightly and his costume rips off. He puts it back on and tricks the bear, while the baby bear is trying to ruin Donald's plans. The baby bear kicks Donald Duck so hard that his costume comes off and he spills honey on himself. Since Donald spills Honey on himself the momma bear and the cub start licking his head.

Voice cast
 Donald Duck: Clarence Nash
 Mother Bear: Candy Candido

Home media
The short was released on December 6, 2005, on Walt Disney Treasures: The Chronological Donald, Volume Two: 1942-1946.

References

Further reading

External links

1946 films
1946 animated films
1946 short films
Donald Duck short films
1940s Disney animated short films
Films based on fairy tales
Films about hunters
Films directed by Jack King
Films produced by Walt Disney
Films scored by Oliver Wallace